Bernhard Aschauer (born 28 May 1945) is a German luger. He competed in the men's doubles event at the 1968 Winter Olympics.

References

External links
 

1945 births
Living people
German male lugers
Olympic lugers of West Germany
Lugers at the 1968 Winter Olympics
People from Königsee
Sportspeople from Thuringia